Vertigine d'amore is a 1949 Italian-French melodrama film directed by Luigi Capuano.

Cast
 Gabriele Ferzetti
 Gabrielle Fontan
 Folco Lulli - Luca / France: Romain Toucas
 Piero Lulli - Olivero / France: Ollivier Desmichels
 Marcello Mastroianni
 Livia Muguet - Gina
 Elli Parvo - Silvana Resplanton / France: Sylvaine Resplandin
 Jone Salinas - Fifi'
 Bella Starace Sainati - Lucia / France: Louisa
 Charles Vanel - Mugnaio Resplanton / France: Emile Resplandin

References

External links

Vertigine d'amore at Variety Distribution

1949 films
1940s Italian-language films
French black-and-white films
Films directed by Luigi Capuano
Italian black-and-white films
Pathé films
Melodrama films
Italian drama films
French drama films
1949 drama films
1940s French films
1940s Italian films
Italian-language French films